Masi Marjamäki (born January 16, 1985) is a Finnish professional ice hockey player who most recently played for Cardiff Devils in the UK EIHL. He previously iced for Piráti Chomutov of the Czech Extraliga (ELH).

Playing career
Marjamäki, a 6'2" 205 pound left wing, was originally drafted by the Boston Bruins as the 66th overall pick in the 2003 NHL Entry Draft. However, he never came to terms with the Bruins and re-entered the draft in 2005, where he was the 144th overall pick by the New York Islanders.

He played his junior hockey first in his hometown Porin Ässät before moving over the ocean to the Red Deer Rebels and the Moose Jaw Warriors of the WHL before becoming professional in the 2005–2006 season.

After totaling 31 points (9 goals and 22 assists) along with 77 penalty minutes in 75 games for Bridgeport (the Islanders' top affiliate) in the 2005–06 season, Marjamäki was called up by the big club and made his NHL debut on April 18, 2006 against the Philadelphia Flyers, logging 5 minutes and 17 seconds of glory.

Marjamäki is known for his gritty, physical style of play but is also a good stickhandler who can put points on the board. He has received comparisons to Kirk Maltby of the NHL's Detroit Red Wings.

After a frustrating start to the 2007–08 AHL season in which Marjamäki was scratched every game, he asked the Islanders to be reassigned to Finland. The Islanders granted his request and he spent the season playing for Ässät.

Marjamäki was signed by Ilves in 2008, and played there until his injury in early 2012–13 season. He was unable to play at all in the 2013–14 season, and signed with local rival Tappara for the 2014–15 season with an additional one year option.

In the 2015–16 season, he played one year for Ässät before joining Jokerit to play in KHL. He played total 61 games for Jokerit during one and a half seasons before joining Almtuna IS of the Swedish HockeyAllsvenskan.

On October 4, 2018, Marjamäki having left Sweden as a free agent continued his career in the Czech Republic, agreeing to a one-year contract with Piráti Chomutov of the ELH for the 2018–19 season.

In July 2019, Marjamäki moved to the UK to sign for the EIHL's Cardiff Devils.

Coaching
Marjamäki became the Skills Coach for the AJHL Blackfalds Bulldogs in the 2021-22 season.

Career statistics

Regular season and playoffs

International

References

External links

1985 births
Almtuna IS players
Ässät players
Boston Bruins draft picks
Bridgeport Sound Tigers players
Finnish ice hockey left wingers
Ilves players
Jokerit players
Living people
Moose Jaw Warriors players
New York Islanders draft picks
New York Islanders players
Piráti Chomutov players
Sportspeople from Pori
Red Deer Rebels players
Tappara players
Cardiff Devils players
Finnish expatriate ice hockey players in Wales
Finnish expatriate ice hockey players in the United States
Finnish expatriate ice hockey players in Canada
Finnish expatriate ice hockey players in Sweden
Finnish expatriate ice hockey players in the Czech Republic